The South African Railways Class GL 4-8-2+2-8-4 of 1929 was an articulated steam locomotive.

In 1929 and 1930, the South African Railways placed eight Class GL Garratt articulated steam locomotives with a 4-8-2+2-8-4 Double Mountain type wheel arrangement in service. Built by Beyer, Peacock & Company in Manchester, England, they were originally designed to work on the Durban to Cato Ridge section of the Natal mainline. The Class GL was eventually displaced to the route between Glencoe and Vryheid before spending their final working years operating on the line from Stanger to Empangeni.

Origin

The Class GL had its origin in the steady increase in loads experienced by the Natal mainline in the years prior to the First World War. The old Natal mainline had gradients of 1 in 30 (3⅓%) whilst the newer line, relocated to provide an easier route, still had  of near-uninterrupted 1 in 66 (1½%) gradients. These factors combined with ever-increasing train weights ensured that the line rapidly became a bottleneck.

The decision to electrify the line from Glencoe Junction to Durban had been taken in 1914, coincidentally the year in which the South African Railways (SAR) ordered its first Cape gauge Garratt, the Class GA . Electrification was placed in abeyance along with the delivery of the Class GA until the end of World War I.

Despite this delay, the process of electrification began in earnest in 1922 and by 1926 full electrified haulage had been instituted between Glencoe and Pietermaritzburg, with lashups of three electric locomotives being used on the heaviest freights. These trains were then hauled onward to Durban by a pair of Class 14 4-8-2 steam locomotives.

The success of the Class GA Garratt in proving the suitability of the Garratt design for South African conditions coupled with the economies in crew, fuel and water consumption it offered, provided an incentive for the SAR to consider a new Garratt class for use on the Natal mainline. The aim was to eliminate double-heading as a regular practice with such a locomotive to be equivalent to three of the Class 1E electric locomotives which were then in use, or two Class 14 steam locomotives.

Manufacturer
Colonel F.R. Collins DSO, the Chief Mechanical Engineer (CME) of the SAR from 1922 to 1929, prepared the specifications and the contract for the design and construction of these locomotives, the Class GL, was awarded to Beyer, Peacock & Company.

Since these locomotives would be some 48% larger and more powerful than any locomotive previously employed on the SAR and up to twice the track gauge in width, the initial order was for two prototype locomotives only, with more to follow should they prove successful. They were delivered in September 1929 and were erected in the Durban shops, numbered 2350 and 2351, and placed in service in October. They proved to be so successful that the remaining six locomotives were quickly ordered for delivery in 1930. These six entered service in July 1930, numbered in the range from 2352 to 2357.

Trials
At the time, they were the most powerful steam locomotives to be placed in service anywhere in the Southern Hemisphere and attained the objective of constructing a locomotive to approximately equal the power output of two Class 14 locomotives. Bishop, Natal Locomotive Superintendent, took part in the design process and successfully carried out the initial tests. Moreover, this was achieved on half throttle and with the cut-off set at 45%.

As a result of these tests, the further six Class GL locomotives were ordered for delivery in 1930. Apart from demonstrating the Class GL's power and capacity for hauling heavy trains, these tests also showed that their running qualities were exceptional, being smooth and free-running machines. In many ways, the Class GL set a design standard which was followed later in the Class GM, Class GMA and Class GO.

Characteristics
The Class GL embodied comparatively few features of any particular novelty. Instead, they were designed to make the best possible use of existing technologies to produce a locomotive of great power, efficiency and reliability. Their all-up weight of  coupled with their  axle loading closely matched the limits laid down by the SAR.

Frame
On the SAR, the bar frame had previously only been employed on the German-built Class GCA 2-6-2+2-6-2 Garratt.

Valves and cylinders
The Class GL made use of Beyer, Peacock's standard lever-actuated Sterling-type steam-operated power reverser and a Pyle National Company turbo-generator. The piston valves were modern straight-ported types with long-lap, long-travel valves, used for the first time in a South African Garratt which made the Class GL very free-running and more efficient than its predecessors. The cylinders, of the same bore and stroke as those of the Class 14, drove the third coupled axles using long connecting rods which stabilised the locomotive by reducing vertical forces at the crosshead to a minimum. This method of design became the standard on most Beyer-Garratts thereafter.

Pivots
To allow for the tight curves, including  radius bends with  superelevation without any intermediate tangent and the steep, twisting nature of the line, the front engine unit's pivot bearing was spherical, with its alignment controlled by sprung rollers. The rear pivot was the usual Beyer, Peacock flat adjustable type.

Boiler and firebox
It used a top feed and contained 263 small tubes of  outside diameter and 50 large tubes of  outside diameter, while the superheater elements were of  diameter. The round-topped firebox with its  grate area was fired by a duplex mechanical stoker, the only class on the SAR which had this feature. The firebox contained two Nicholson thermic syphons and two arch tubes. Clyde Superior soot blowers were fitted on each side of the firebox.

The Class GL had a rocking grate and self-cleaning hopper ashpan with water and steam sprayers to dampen down the ash to prevent it from entering axle boxes, motion areas and other friction-sensitive places. They had self-cleaning type smokeboxes and their axle boxes were grease-lubricated.

Crew comfort
This proved less than satisfactory, as did the smoke deflecting cowls over the chimneys of the second batch of locomotives. These cowls were controlled by steam-operated cylinders and, when not required, could be withdrawn longitudinally from the position over the chimney orifice. Since Garratts are designed to be bi-directional, the problem was eventually solved by simply running them with the chimney trailing on the ascending legs of the tunneled routes.

Service
Owing to limitations in the length of sidings and crossing loops, the Class GL's allowed loads were originally  from Durban to Cato Ridge and  coastward, despite having shown themselves capable of greater loads.

During April 1931, no. 2351 hauled a special train conveying the Governor-General of South Africa, His Excellency the Earl of Athlone and Princess Alice. The Governor-General and the Princess travelled on the footplate from Cato Ridge to Umlaas and expressed keen delight at the experience, which led to the Princess granting the SAR permission to name the locomotive on which she had travelled after her. The name plates were affixed to the cabsides above the number plates.

In 1947, no. 2352 was the Garratt selected to haul the Royal Train between Glencoe and Piet Retief while sister engine no. 2355 hauled the pilot train over the same section.

Upon completion of the electrification project between Durban and Pietermaritzburg in 1938, the eight locomotives were transferred from the Durban section to the gruelling run between Glencoe and Vryheid with the latter's coal trains. This work entailed the regular haulage of  up gradients of 1 in 50, taxing the Class GL even more heavily than the work for which it was designed. Despite this, they maintained an effective service along this line until its electrification in 1968.

The Class GL was then transferred from Glencoe to work the line between Stanger and Empangeni in the late 1940s. However, since the loads on this route did not fully justify the use of the powerful Class GL while their great weight and high axle loading restricted them to mainlines laid with heavy rail, they were eventually replaced by less powerful, more modern and more economical Class GMA locomotives. Though briefly considered as hump shunters at Bloemfontein, the Class GL had outlasted its use and after some forty-two years of working the most difficult terrain on the SAR, they were withdrawn from service in 1972.

Preservation
Of the eight locomotives, the first two have survived into preservation. No. 2351 Princess Alice is preserved at the Outeniqua Transport Museum in George. 

No. 2352 was allocated to the National Collection of the South African Railway Museum. It was staged at Greyville Loco in Durban at the time and the Loco Foreman at Greyville was asked to prepare the engine for haulage up to Germiston Loco where it was intended to stage the engine. His response was that no engine would leave his Depot under haulage and that he would have it prepared to steam and travel up to Germiston under its own power, which it did in due course.

The development of the planned new museum was shelved indefinitely and the condition of the locomotive gradually deteriorated where it stood at Germiston. Some eight years later, in 1983 the Science & Industry Museum. Manchester after failing to acquire East African Railways 59 class 5930, because of high shipping costs, asked if it could acquire the engine. This request was granted and with the help of shipping sponsors, it duly arrived back in Manchester. By the time it was shipped to England, it was shorn of around two hundred parts including its right-hand-side ashpan and much of its brick arch.

References

External links

2470
4-8-2+2-8-4 locomotives
2D1+1D2 locomotives
Beyer, Peacock locomotives
Garratt locomotives
Cape gauge railway locomotives
Railway locomotives introduced in 1929